Nicolas Pino (1819–1896) was a Mexican loyalist, civil and military leader who participated in planned resistance and rebellion against the U.S. occupation of New Mexico. Following the Treaty of Guadalupe Hidalgo, he swore allegiance to the United States and became a Union officer during American Civil War, rising to the rank of brigadier general on September 9, 1861. He later served in the New Mexico Territorial legislature.

Capture of Santa Fe & Revolt of 1846
The Pino brothers, Facundo, Miguel E. and Nicolas were all very influential in the affairs of New Mexico at the time of General Kearny's Capture of Santa Fe. The Pino family members held prominent positions under the Mexican government, were reputed fighters of daring and courage. They raised companies and procured arms and ammunition in response to governor Manuel Armijo's call for volunteers in preparation to resist Kearney at Apache Canyon, but were disgusted and dismayed when Armijo disbanded the forces and fled to Mexico. None of the Pinos immediately took Kearny's required oath of allegiance to the U.S. following the occupation, still considering themselves citizens of the Mexican republic. Soon after, they participated in meetings led by Don Diego Archuleta at a home near the military church, La Castrenza, in Santa Fe, where Tomas Ortiz was elected as governor with Archuleta as commanding general. A rebellion was planned to take place on December 19, 1846, and later postponed to Christmas Eve. Mexican loyalist emissaries were sent out to all nearest points demanding that the people take part in the uprising in Santa Fe upon the third bell for midnight mass (Missa del Gallo), when all of the American officers would be captured. This plan fell through, however, after it became known to Donaciano Vigil, by way of the proprietress of the city's largest gambling house, Tules Barcelona. Vigil informed General Sterling Price, of the Second Missouri Mounted Volunteers, who had a number of conspirators arrested, including Nicolas Pino. Tomas Ortiz, Nicolas' cousin, escaped in the garb of a servant girl and fled to Chihuahua. General Price stationed soldiers at the homes of every know revolutionist.

American allegiance: Taos Revolt, Civil War & Territorial Legislature
Following the failed revolt of 1846, neither Miguel E., nor Nicolas Pino participated in any further resistance movements. Don Nicolas took the oath of allegiance to the United States after he was released from prison and enlisted in Captain St. Vrain's company of volunteers following the assassination of governor Bent, participating in the defeat of the insurgents at the Taos Revolt with his friend Don Manuel Chaves.

After the treaty of peace with Mexico, the Pino brothers were considered to be amongst the most loyal to the United States government. All of the brothers held both civil and military positions of trust. Don Miguel and Don Nicolas both commanded substantial bodies of volunteers during the American Civil War. Until their deaths, there was always a Pino in the house or council of the territorial legislative assembly. Don Facundo served several times as president of the council, as did Don Miguel E. in 1865 and 1866. Don Nicolas served as council president in 1869, and as a council member in 1873 and 1878. Tomas Ortiz returned to New Mexico and also served in the Territorial Legislature.

During the American Civil War, Nicolas led the 2nd New Mexico Militia.  On February 25, 1862, Colonel Pino and his 200 Hispanic militiamen attempted to make a stand against Brigadier General Henry Hopkins Sibley at the town of Socorro, New Mexico, but they were quickly forced to surrender when the Texans opened fire with a piece of artillery. His brother, Colonel Miguel Pino, led 590 men in the 2nd New Mexico Volunteers.

Parents & death
Nicolas' father was Pedro Bautista Pino, the only person to represent New Mexico in the Cortes of Spain. In 1811, while in Cádiz, Pedro wrote a short history of New Mexico contained in a report to the king. His mother, Ana Maria, was the daughter of Ana Gertrudis Ortiz Niño Ladron de Guevarra and Juan Domingo Baca, and a granddaughter of Don Pedro de Bustamante, a governor and captain-general of the Province of New Mexico.

Don Nicolas survived his brothers. He died at the age of 77 in November 1896, and is buried in the village cemetery in Galisteo.

Pino, his brother Miguel, and their mother Ana Maria all owned Indigenous slaves. The Pino family did not benefit from the enslavement of Black people and thus had little economic incentive to endorse Black chattel slavery or the Confederacy, with Miguel Pino being actively opposed to the enslavement of Black people despite his family's ownership of enslaved Indigenous people. The enslaved Indigenous women who were forced to work on Nicolas Pino's ranch not only "performed services for their masters" but also "symbolized social wealth".

References

1819 births
1896 deaths
American military leaders
Hispanic and Latino American slave owners
New Mexico Territory officials
People of New Mexico in the American Civil War
Union Army colonels